The 2012–13 season was Everton's 21st season in the Premier League and 59th consecutive season in the top division of English football. It is also Everton's 114th season of league football and 116th season in all competitions. Having finished in seventh position in the domestic league in the previous season, Everton missed out on competing in any European competitions for the third season running.

The club entered the League Cup in the second round and were knocked out in the subsequent round following a 2–1 away defeat by Championship side Leeds United. Everton entered the FA Cup in the third round and progressed to the quarter-finals where they suffered a 3–0 loss at home to Premier League relegation candidates Wigan Athletic. Everton had a very consistent league campaign, never dropping below seventh place throughout the whole season. Highlights included a 1–0 win over Manchester United in the first game of the season, scoring two stoppage time goals to defeat Tottenham Hotspur 2–1 and a 2–0 home win over reigning Premier League champions Manchester City. However, too many draws and a lack of goals saw Everton's push for a European place fade and they finished sixth in the league. It did mean that the club finished above rivals Liverpool for the second successive season for the first time since 1937.

On 9 May, manager David Moyes announced he would be ending his 11-year tenure at the club when his contract expired at the end of the season, to become the new manager of Manchester United. Moyes transformed the club from struggling at the lower end of the league to regularly competing for the European places. He took charge of the team for over 500 games, including four European campaigns despite often working with a limited budget. Everton's average league position under his management was eighth and they never finished below this in each of his last seven seasons. However, he also received criticism for never winning a trophy during his time at the club.

Season overview

June
On 1 June 2012, Everton's first pre-season friendly fixtures were announced: an away game against League Two side Morecambe acting as a testimonial to Morecambe's player-manager Jim Bentley, and a second away fixture against Scottish Premier League side Dundee United, and on 7 June 2012 a second match to be played in Scotland was announced, against Motherwell F.C. at their home ground Fir Park Stadium. A further three friendly fixtures were later determined: a home game against AEK Athens as a testimonial match for Everton's long-serving defender Tony Hibbert, and away matches against Blackpool and Spanish side Málaga, the latter serving as the 29th edition of the annual Trofeo Costa del Sol friendly competition. Everton was also initially scheduled to take part in the inaugural edition of the Java Cup, a four-team competition held in Indonesia, but later withdrew due to scheduling difficulties and security concerns.

July
On 4 July, Everton made their first move of the summer transfer window, bringing in former Rangers striker Steven Naismith, who had refused to sign a contract to move him from the old Rangers to the new company following their liquidation.

On 14 July, Everton won their first pre-season match against Morecambe at the Globe Arena on 14 July 2012, with a score of 4–1, with recent recruit Francisco Júnior scoring his first ever goal for the club.

On 26 July, Tim Cahill's eight-year stay at the club came to an end when he signed for the New York Red Bulls in a £1 million deal.

On 31 July, Steven Pienaar, who had made a significant impact during his loan spell at the end of last season, signed permanently for the club for £4.5 million and thus began his third stint at Everton.

August
On 6 August, Fenerbahçe completed a £2 million move for Joseph Yobo, who had not played for Everton since May 2010 due to two season-long loans at the Turkish side.

On 8 August, during his testimonial match against AEK Athens, Tony Hibbert (the player with the longest current spell without scoring a goal in English football) broke his goalscoring duck with a 25-yard free-kick, the last of Everton's goals in a 4–1 win. Hibbert is still yet to score a competitive goal in his career.

On 12 August, reigning Premier League champions Manchester City signed Jack Rodwell for £12 million, which could rise to £17 million depending on individual and team performances.

On 19 August, Belgium international Kevin Mirallas signed for the club from Greek champions Olympiacos for a £6 million fee.

On 20 August, Everton began their season with a 1–0 win over last year's runners-up Manchester United. Marouane Fellaini was the scorer, with a headed goal in the 57th minute. This was the first time in five years that Everton had won their opening league game.

On 25 August, Everton took their unbeaten run in the Premier League to 11 games following a 3–1 away victory against Aston Villa.

On 29 August, new signing Mirallas scored his first and second goals for the club during an emphatic 5–0 League Cup win over Leyton Orient to help Everton advance to the third round.

On 31 August, the final day of the summer transfer window, Everton signed versatile Costa Rican international Bryan Oviedo from Danish side Copenhagen for an undisclosed fee, believed to be £5 million.

September
On 1 September, Everton missed the chance to extend their unbeaten run in the league to 12 games when they lost 0–2 to West Bromwich Albion. If they had avoided defeat it would have been their longest spell without a loss since the title winning 1984–85 season.

On 22 September, Everton beat Swansea City 3–0 to move to second place in the league and ensure they have never lost a league encounter against the Welsh side.

On 25 September, Everton were knocked out of the League Cup following a 1–2 defeat by Championship side Leeds United in the third round at Elland Road.

On 29 September, Everton recorded their fourth win in the Premier League after they beat Southampton 3–1 at Goodison Park. The win saw them move up to second in the table.

October
On 9 October, David Moyes was named Premier League Manager of the Month for September.

On 19 October, Everton signed free agent Thomas Hitzlsperger until January on a short term contract. The German international has 52 caps and had been without a club since leaving VfL Wolfsburg at the end of last season.

On 21 October, following the club's 1–1 draw with Queens Park Rangers, Everton had scored 15 goals from 8 games, their best ever scoring start to a Premier League season.

On 28 October, Everton faced Liverpool in the Merseyside Derby at Goodison Park. The game saw Everton grab a 2–2 draw after being two goals down.

November
On 3 November, the club drew 2–2 with Fulham at Craven Cottage. This meant Everton had drawn a game for the fourth successive time.

On 10 November, Everton ended a run of four successive draws with a 2–1 win over Sunderland to remain fourth in the table. It was the sixth game in a row where Everton had avoided defeat after going a goal down and stretched David Moyes' unbeaten run against Sunderland to 18 matches in his 400th Premier League game.

On 17 November, Everton lost to Reading. This was Everton's first league defeat in nine games.

On 24 November, Everton drew at home with Norwich City. Norwich's 90th-minute goal was the third time this season that Everton had conceded a last minute equaliser.

December
On 1 December, Everton drew 1–1 with title holders Manchester City at the Etihad Stadium. This result meant that Everton had been unbeaten in six out of the last seven meetings with City. The result also meant that Everton had drawn seven of their last nine games.

On 9 December, the club scored two stoppage time goals to beat Tottenham Hotspur 2–1. The first of these goals, a header from Steven Pienaar, was Everton's 1,000th in the Premier League.

On 11 December, Marouane Fellaini was named Premier League Player of the Month for November after scoring four goals in Everton's five games during the month.

On 15 December, Fellaini again made the headlines for allegedly headbutting Ryan Shawcross in Everton's 1–1 draw at Stoke City. Fellaini subsequently received a three-match ban for his actions. Stoke's goal was the 1,000th that Everton have conceded in the Premier League era.

On 22 December, Everton travelled to West Ham United and won 2–1. This game marked the first time that a Moyes' Everton side had recovered from a goal down at half-time to win away from home.

On 26 December, Everton defeated Wigan Athletic at Goodison Park 2–1. This result meant that Everton stretched their unbeaten run to seven league games. Wigan's consolation goal also meant that Everton had failed to keep a clean sheet in any of the previous 14 games they had played.

On 30 December, Everton lost to Chelsea at home, ending an unbeaten run at Goodison Park that stretched back to March.

January
On 2 January, Everton won 2–1 at Newcastle United, marking the first time in 21 months that they had won successive away games. The club scored and conceded for the 16th consecutive game which is a Premier League record.

On 7 January, Everton progressed to the fourth round of the FA Cup with a 5–1 away win at League Two side Cheltenham Town.

On 12 January, Everton drew 0–0 at home to Swansea, keeping their first clean sheet in 19 league and cup games, while they failed to score for the first time in the last 21 league and cup games.

On 28 January, the club won through to the fifth round of the FA Cup following a 2–1 away defeat of Championship side Bolton Wanderers.

On 30 January Everton defeated West Brom 2–1 at Goodison Park.

On 31 January, Everton made their only signing of the January transfer window, acquiring 18-year-old John Stones from Barnsley for a fee reported to be in the region of £3 million.

February
On 2 February, Everton rallied from a two-goal deficit to draw at home with relegation strugglers Aston Villa.

On 16 February, Everton conceded an injury time equaliser to Oldham Athletic in the fifth round of the FA Cup, forcing a replay at Goodison Park at the end of the month.

On 23 February, Everton conceded an injury time winner to Norwich to lose 2–1 at Carrow Road. The defeat meant that Everton lost for the second time in a row.

On 26 February, the club advanced to the quarter-finals of the FA Cup following a 3–1 victory over Oldham in the replay.

March
On 12 March, Everton begin the month with a 3–1 win over Reading.

On 9 March, Everton crashed out of the FA Cup with a 0–3 home defeat by Premier League relegation candidates Wigan, with all three goals coming in less than four first-half minutes.

On 16 March, Everton bounced back in the league to beat reigning champions Manchester City 2–0 at Goodison Park, despite playing with ten men from the 60th minute with the score at 1–0, when Steven Pienaar was dismissed. The win came on the day of Moyes' 11th anniversary with the club.

On 30 March, Everton defeated Stoke 1–0. It was Everton's third league win in a row.

April
On 5 April, Moyes was named Premier League Manager of the Month for March, the second time he has won the award this season and the tenth in total.

On 7 April, Everton drew 2–2 at Tottenham, ending a three-game winning streak.

On 13 April, Everton defeated relegation struggles Queens Park Rangers 2–0 at Goodison Park. The victory saw the Toffees unbeaten in the last five games.

On 16 April, Everton drew 0–0 at Arsenal, only the second time the club had avoided defeat at Arsenal in the last 16 years.

On 20 April, Everton suffered a 1–0 defeat at Sunderland, hampering their bid for European qualification.

On 27 April, Everton beat Fulham at home 1–0 in the league, meaning they have won all 20 league encounters at home against Fulham.

May
On 5 May, Everton drew 0–0 away at Liverpool.

On 9 May, the club confirmed that Moyes would be leaving Everton at the end of the season to join Manchester United as manager.

On 12 May, Everton won their final home game of the season against West Ham, 2–0, ensuring a second consecutive season of finishing above rivals Liverpool.

Competitions

Preseason

Premier League

League table

Results summary

Results by round

Matches

League Cup

FA Cup

Players

First-team squad

Out on loan

Reserve squad

Out on loan

Player awards 
 Player of the Season - Leighton Baines
 Players' Player of the Season - Leighton Baines
 Young Player of the Season - Ross Barkley
 Academy Player of the Season - Chris Long
 Goal of the Season - Kevin Mirallas vs Stoke City

Statistics

Appearances

|}

Goalscorers

{| class="wikitable sortable" style="text-align:center"
! width=15px | 
! width=150px | Name
! width=50px | PremierLeague
! width=50px | FA Cup
! width=50px | LeagueCup
! width=50px | Total
|-
| 1 || align=left| Marouane Fellaini || 11 || 1 || 0 || 12
|-
| 2 ||align=left| Kevin Mirallas || 6 || 1 || 2 || 9
|-
| rowspan=3|3 ||align=left| Victor Anichebe || 6 || 1 || 1 || 8
|-
|align=left| Nikica Jelavić || 7 || 1 || 0 || 8
|-
|align=left| Leon Osman || 5 || 2 || 1 || 8
|-
| rowspan=2|6 ||align=left| Leighton Baines || 5 || 2 || 0 || 7
|-
|align=left| Steven Pienaar || 6 || 1 || 0 || 7
|-
| 8 ||align=left| Steven Naismith || 4 || 0 || 0 || 4
|-
| 9 ||align=left| Phil Jagielka || 2 || 1 || 0 || 3
|-
| rowspan=5|10 || align=left| Séamus Coleman || 0 || 1 || 0 || 1
|-
|align=left| Sylvain Distin || 0 || 0 || 1 || 1
|-
|align=left| Darron Gibson || 1 || 0 || 0 || 1
|-
|align=left| Magaye Gueye || 0 || 0 || 1 || 1
|-
|align=left| John Heitinga || 0 || 1 || 0 || 1
|- class="sortbottom"
| colspan="2"|Own goals || 2 || 0 || 0 || 2
|- class="unsortable"
!colspan="2"|Total || 55 || 12 || 6 || 73
|-

Disciplinary record
{| class="wikitable" style="text-align: center; width: 50%"
|-
! rowspan="2" width=15px |
! rowspan="2" width=120px |Name
! colspan="3" width=50px |Premier League
! colspan="3" width=50px |FA Cup
! colspan="3" width=50px |League Cup
! colspan="3" width=50px |Total
|-
!  style="width:25px; background:#fe9;"|
!  style="width:28px; background:#ff8888;"|
!  style="width:25px; background:#ff8888;"|
!  style="width:25px; background:#fe9;"|
!  style="width:28px; background:#ff8888;"|
!  style="width:25px; background:#ff8888;"|
!  style="width:25px; background:#fe9;"|
!  style="width:28px; background:#ff8888;"|
!  style="width:25px; background:#ff8888;"|
!  style="width:25px; background:#fe9;"|
!  style="width:28px; background:#ff8888;"|
!  style="width:25px; background:#ff8888;"|
|-
|1
|align=left| Marouane Fellaini
|9
|0
|0
|2
|0
|0
|1
|0
|0
|12
|0
|0
|-
|2
|align=left| Steven Pienaar
|5
|2
|0
|0
|0
|0
|0
|0
|0
|5
|2
|0
|-
|3
|align=left| Leon Osman
|9
|0
|0
|1
|0
|0
|0
|0
|0
|10
|0
|0
|-
| rowspan=2|4
|align=left| John Heitinga
|5
|0
|0
|0
|0
|0
|1
|0
|0
|6
|0
|0
|-
|align=left| Phil Neville
|4
|0
|0
|2
|0
|0
|0
|0
|0
|6
|0
|0
|-
|6
|align=left| Darron Gibson
|4
|0
|0
|1
|0
|0
|0
|0
|0
|5
|0
|0
|-
| rowspan=3|7
|align=left| Leighton Baines
|4
|0
|0
|0
|0
|0
|0
|0
|0
|4
|0
|0
|-
|align=left| Séamus Coleman
|4
|0
|0
|0
|0
|0
|0
|0
|0
|4
|0
|0
|-
|align=left| Nikica Jelavić
|4
|0
|0
|0
|0
|0
|0
|0
|0
|4
|0
|0
|-
|10
|align=left| Kevin Mirallas
|3
|0
|0
|0
|0
|0
|0
|0
|0
|3
|0
|0
|-
| rowspan=4|11
|align=left| Victor Anichebe
|2
|0
|0
|0
|0
|0
|0
|0
|0
|2
|0
|0
|-
|align=left| Ross Barkley
|2
|0
|0
|0
|0
|0
|0
|0
|0
|2
|0
|0
|-
|align=left| Sylvain Distin
|2
|0
|0
|0
|0
|0
|0
|0
|0
|2
|0
|0
|-
|align=left| Bryan Oviedo
|1
|0
|0
|0
|0
|0
|1
|0
|0
|2
|0
|0
|-
| rowspan=2|15
|align=left| Tony Hibbert
|1
|0
|0
|0
|0
|0
|0
|0
|0
|1
|0
|0
|-
|align=left| Phil Jagielka
|1
|0
|0
|0
|0
|0
|0
|0
|0
|1
|0
|0
|-
!colspan=2|Total
!50 !! 2 !! 0 !! 6 !! 0 !! 0 !! 3 !! 0 !! 0 !! 59 !! 2 !! 0

Home attendances

Correct as of match played 12 May 2013

{| class="wikitable sortable" style="text-align:center; font-size:90%"
|-
!width=100 | Comp
!width=120 | Date
!width=60 | Score
!width=250 class="unsortable" | Opponent
!width=150 | Attendance
|-
|Premier League||20 August 2012 ||bgcolor="#CCFFCC"|1–0 ||Manchester United ||38,415
|-
|League Cup||29 August 2012 ||bgcolor="#CCFFCC"|5–0 ||Leyton Orient ||24,124
|-
|Premier League||17 September 2012 ||bgcolor="#FFFFCC"|2–2 ||Newcastle United ||32,510
|-
|Premier League||29 September 2012 ||bgcolor="#CCFFCC"|3–1 ||Southampton ||37,922
|-
|Premier League||28 October 2012 ||bgcolor="#FFFFCC"|2–2 ||Liverpool ||39,613
|-
|Premier League||10 November 2012 ||bgcolor="#CCFFCC"|2–1 ||Sunderland ||35,999
|-
|Premier League||24 November 2012 ||bgcolor="#FFFFCC"|1–1 ||Norwich City ||34,502
|-
|Premier League||28 November 2012 ||bgcolor="#FFFFCC"|1–1 ||Arsenal ||37,141
|-
|Premier League||9 December 2012 ||bgcolor="#CCFFCC"|2–1 ||Tottenham Hotspur ||36,494
|-
|Premier League||26 December 2012 ||bgcolor="#CCFFCC"|2–1 ||Wigan Athletic ||38,749
|-
|Premier League||30 December 2012 ||bgcolor="#FFCCCC"|1–2 ||Chelsea ||39,485
|-
|Premier League||12 January 2013 ||bgcolor="#FFFFCC"|0–0 ||Swansea City ||35,782
|-
|Premier League||30 January 2013 ||bgcolor="#CCFFCC"|2–1 ||West Bromwich Albion ||31,376
|-
|Premier League||2 February 2013 ||bgcolor="#FFFFCC"|3–3 ||Aston Villa ||38,121
|-
|FA Cup||26 February 2013 ||bgcolor="#CCFFCC"|3–1 ||Oldham Athletic ||32,688
|-
|Premier League||1 March 2013 ||bgcolor="#CCFFCC"|3–1 ||Reading ||35,244
|-
|FA Cup||9 March 2013 ||bgcolor="#FFCCCC"|0–3 ||Wigan Athletic ||35,068
|-
|Premier League||16 March 2013 ||bgcolor="#CCFFCC"|2–0 ||Manchester City ||36,519
|-
|Premier League||30 March 2013 ||bgcolor="#CCFFCC"|1–0 ||Stoke City ||33,977
|-
|Premier League||13 April 2013 ||bgcolor="#CCFFCC"|2–0 ||Queens Park Rangers ||34,876
|-
|Premier League||27 April 2013 ||bgcolor="#CCFFCC"|1–0 ||Fulham ||34,563
|-
|Premier League||12 May 2013 ||bgcolor="#CCFFCC"|2–0 ||West Ham United ||39,475
|-
|bgcolor="#C0C0C0"|
|bgcolor="#C0C0C0"|
|bgcolor="#C0C0C0"|
| Total attendance
|782,643
|-
|bgcolor="#C0C0C0"|
|bgcolor="#C0C0C0"|
|bgcolor="#C0C0C0"|
| Total league attendance
|690,763
|-
|bgcolor="#C0C0C0"|
|bgcolor="#C0C0C0"|
|bgcolor="#C0C0C0"|
| Average attendance
|35,575
|-
|bgcolor="#C0C0C0"|
|bgcolor="#C0C0C0"|
|bgcolor="#C0C0C0"|
| Average league attendance
|36,356

Transfers

Transfers in

Transfers out

Loans in

Loans out

Awards

Player of the Month
Awarded by Everton F.C. to the best first team Everton player of the month.

Premier League Player of the Month

End-of-season awards

PFA Premier League Team of the Year

References

External links
 

2012-13
2012–13 Premier League by team